The 1908 Montana gubernatorial election was held on November 3, 1908.

Incumbent Democratic Governor Edwin L. Norris was re-elected, defeating Republican nominee Edward Donlan and Socialist nominee Harry Hazelton with 47.34% of the vote.

General election

Candidates
Edwin L. Norris, Democratic, incumbent Governor
Edward Donlan, Republican, lumber merchant
Harry Hazelton, Socialist

Results

References

Bibliography
 
 
 

1908
Montana
Gubernatorial